Vrh pri Šentjerneju is a small settlement west of Šentjernej in southeastern Slovenia. The entire Municipality of Šentjernej is part of the traditional region of Lower Carniola and is now included in the Southeast Slovenia Statistical Region.

Name
The name of the settlement was changed from Vrh to Vrh pri Šentjerneju in 1953.

References

External links
Vrh pri Šentjerneju on Geopedia

Populated places in the Municipality of Šentjernej